The 2005-06 season is the tenth in the history of the Glasgow Warriors as a professional side. Since the professional side began in 1996 it had used a warrior logo; with a warrior clutching a rugby ball in one hand - and in the other a Scottish targe ordained with a long steel spike originating from its central boss. The warrior is wearing a simple Spangenhelm conical peaked nasal helmet illustrating an early warrior from the Kingdom of Strathclyde.

The warrior logo was formalised into Glasgow's name from this season onwards. The team was now officially known as Glasgow Warriors and formally competed as such.

The 2005-06 season saw Glasgow Warriors compete in the competitions: the Magners Celtic League and the European Champions Cup, the Heineken Cup for sponsorship reasons.

Season Overview
Move to Firhill Stadium
New Head Coach

Team

Coaches

Head coach:  Hugh Campbell to March 2006;  Sean Lineen from March 2006
Assistant coach:  Shade Munro
Assistant coach:  Sean Lineen to March 2006.
Assistant coach:  Gary Mercer from June 2005.
Strength and Fitness Coach:  Mark Bitcon
Academy coach:  Stephen Gemmell

Staff

Media Manager: Sarah Niblock
Marketing Manager: Fraser Bedwell
Team Facilitators: Dougie Mills, Kim Gray
Sales & Promotions Executive: Colin Marr
Business Manager: Diane Murphy
Team Doctor: Gerry Haggerty
Physiotherapists: Bob Stewart, Lisa Casey

Squad

Academy players

  Stuart Corsar - Prop
  James Eddie - Flanker
  John Barclay - Flanker
  Scott Forrest - Number Eight
  Iain Kennedy - Fly-half
  Colin Gregor - Fly-half

Player statistics

During the 2005–06 season, Glasgow have used 38 different players in competitive games. The table below shows the number of appearances and points scored by each player.

Staff movements

Coaches

Promotions

 Sean Lineen to Head Coach

Personnel In

 Gary Mercer from  Castleford Tigers Rugby League

Personnel Out

 Hugh Campbell

Player movements

Academy promotions

Player transfers

In

  Graham Calder from  Currie
  Steven Manning from  Ayr
  Calum Cusiter from  Boroughmuir
  Ben Addison from  Stirling County
  Gavin Dodd from  Oldham R.L.F.C. (RL)
  Ben Cairns from  Edinburgh (loan)

Out

  Graham Calder to  Currie
  Steven Manning to  Ayr
  Calum Cusiter to  Boroughmuir
  Ben Addison to  Stirling County
  Gavin Dodd to  Widnes Vikings (RL)
  Steven Duffy to  Glasgow Hawks
  Ben Cairns to  Edinburgh (loan ends)

Competitions

Pre-season and friendlies

Match 1

Ayr:
Replacements:

Glasgow Warriors: Stuart Corsar, Fergus Thomson, Ben Prescott, Tim Barker, Dan Turner, Paul Dearlove, Andy Wilson, Jon Petrie, Sam Pinder, Scott Barrow, Ben Addison, Iain Kennedy, Andy Craig, Rory Lamont, Graydon Staniforth
Replacements: Scott Lawson, Steve Swindall, Dan Parks, Graham Calder, Mike Roberts, Gregor Hayter, Craig Hamilton, Colin Shaw,Andrew Henderson, Lee Harrison, John Barclay

Match 2

Glasgow Warriors: Kevin Tkachuk, Scott Lawson, Lee Harrison, Craig Hamilton, Steve Swindall, Andy Wilson, Jon Petrie (captain)Graeme Beveridge, Dan Parks, Mike Roberts, Andrew Henderson, Andy Craig, Rory Lamont, Colin Shaw
Replacements: (all used) Fergus Thomson, Paul Dearlove, Dan Turner, Colin Gregor, Eddie McLaughlin, Gregor Hayter, John Barclay,Alasdhair MacFarlane, Graydon Staniforth, Stuart Corsar, Calvin Howarth

Rotherham Titans:Anthony Carter; David Strettle, Lee Blackett (captain), Tom Allen, Errie Classens; Mike Whitehead, Joe Bedford; Attie Pienaar, Neil Hannah, Jarleth Carey, Rob Walton, Nathan Pike, Hendre Fourie, Scott Donald, Neil Cochrane
Replacements: Morne Jonker, Lodewyk Strauss, N D Monye, Jon Golding, Adam Hopcroft, Lewi McGowan, Ben Wade

Match 3

Glasgow Warriors: Stuart Corsar, Fergus Thomson, Lee Harrison, James Eddie, Dan Turner, Gregor Hayter, John Barclay, Paul Dearlove, Alasdhair MacFarlane, Calvin Howarth, Rory Lamont, Scott Barrow, Iain Kennedy, Eddie McLaughlin, Graydon Staniforth
Replacements: Scott Lawson, Tim Barker, Andy Wilson, Colin Gregor, Eric Milligan, Calum Cusiter, Kevin Tkachuk, Jon Petrie, Stephen Manning, Ben Addison, Stephen Duffy

Edinburgh Gunners: Ben Cairns, Andrew Easson, Peter Jorgensen, Matt Dey, Michael Pyke, Duncan Hodge, Rory Lawson, Grant Anderson, Andrew Kelly, Allan Jacobsen, Fergus Pringle, Scott Murray, captain, Simon Cross, Allan Macdonald, Ally Strokosch. 
Replacements: Nick De Luca, Simon Webster, Ander Monro, Jamie Blackwood, Craig Smith, Steven Lawrie, Dave Hewett, Ally Dickinson, Steven Turnbull, Matt Mustchin, Apolosi Satala

Match 4

Newcastle Falcons: M Burke; T May, J Noon, M Mayerhofler, A Elliott; D Walder, H CharltonI Peel, A Long, T Paoletti, A Perry, G Parling, P Dowson, C Harris, C Charvis
Replacements: (all used) M Ward, R Morris, M Thompson, M Wilkinson, J Grindal, S Grimes, L GrossE Williamson, M Tait, J Hoyle, T Flood, M McCarthy, B Woods

Glasgow Warriors: Kevin Tkachuk, Scott Lawson, Lee Harrison, Gregor Hayter, Craig Hamilton, Paul Dearlove, Andy Wilson, Jon Petrie,Sam Pinder, Dan Parks, Mike Roberts, Andrew Henderson, Andy Craig, Rory Lamont, Colin Shaw
Replacements: Fergus Thomson, Tim Barker, John Barclay, Graeme Beveridge, Calvin Howarth, Scott Barrow, Eddie McLaughlin, Graydon Staniforth, Stuart Corsar, Dan Turner

Match 5

Newcastle Falcons Academy: Andrew Skeen, Cameron Johnston, Mark Laycock, Mark Wilkinson, Gareth Kerr, Joe Shaw, Lee Dickson, Grant Anderson, Matt Thompson, David Wilson, Ben Marshall, Andy Buist, Eni Gesinde, Jamie Rennie, Greg Irvin
Replacements: Ross Batty, Danny Brown, Jonny Williams, Stuart Mackie, Phil Dawson, Phil Ludford, Tom Jokelson, Gavin Beasley,James Shiel

Glasgow Warriors: Stuart Corsar, Fergus Thomson, Lee Harrison, Tim Barker, Dan Turner, Steve Swindall, Gregor Hayter, Paul Dearlove,Graeme Beveridge, Colin Gregor, Colin Shaw, Scott Barrow, Graeme Morrison, Hefin O'Hare, Graydon Staniforth
Replacements: Eric Milligan, Scott Forrest, Sam Pinder, Steven Duffy, Gavin Dodd

European Champions Cup

Pool 5

Results

Round 1

Round 2

Round 3

Round 4

Round 5

Round 6

Magners Celtic League

Teams played 20 matches each but were deemed as playing 22 with 8 pts added to their score.

League table

Results

Round 1

Round 2

Round 3

Round 4

Round 5

Round 6

Glasgow Warriors sat out this round.

Round 7

Round 8

Round 9

Round 10

Glasgow Warriors sat out this round.

Round 11

Round 12

Round 13

Round 14

Round 15

Round 16

Round 17

Round 18

Round 19

Round 20

Round 21

Round 22

Competitive debuts this season

A player's nationality shown is taken from the nationality at the highest honour for the national side obtained; or if never capped internationally their place of birth. Senior caps take precedence over junior caps or place of birth; junior caps take precedence over place of birth. A player's nationality at debut may be different from the nationality shown. Combination sides like the British and Irish Lions or Pacific Islanders are not national sides, or nationalities.

Players in BOLD font have been capped by their senior international XV side as nationality shown.

Players in Italic font have capped either by their international 7s side; or by the international XV 'A' side as nationality shown.

Players in normal font have not been capped at senior level.

A position in parentheses indicates that the player debuted as a substitute. A player may have made a prior debut for Glasgow Warriors in a non-competitive match, 'A' match or 7s match; these matches are not listed.

Tournaments where competitive debut made:

Crosshatching indicates a jointly hosted match.

Sponsorship

Main Sponsor

 Highland Spring

Official Kit Supplier

KooGa

Club Sponsors

 Maclay Murray & Spens
 Visit Scotland

Partners

 McCrea Financial Services
 The Glasgow Club

References

2005-06
Glasgow
Glasgow
Glasgow